Peter Joseph Shields (April 4, 1862 – September 28, 1962) helped found the University of California  at Davis, and was a superior court judge for the State of California.

Early life

He was born April 4, 1862, at the Shields Ranch, which was located near Rancho Cordova, California on the American River, to John Shields who emigrated in 1850 from Donegal, Ireland and Elizabeth (née Bowe) Shields, who emigrated from Waterford, Ireland in 1855. Both parents had survived the Great Hunger or Great Famine which occurred beginning in 1845, and both had walked the Panama Isthmus on foot to arrive in San Francisco, and later, Sacramento.

His father, John, had participated in the Gold Rush in California and dug up 80 nuggets to purchase the undeveloped property, which became the Shields Ranch. He was the third child, and named Peter after his mother's first husband, who died of cholera on the ship taking them from the Isthmus of Panama to San Francisco, where she buried him in the sandy cliffs of the new city.

Personal life
He married Carolee Wiltsie of Sacramento in 1901, and celebrated their 50th  anniversary in 1951. The couple had one child who did not survive infancy.

Career

He earned his first dollar trucking watermelons from the ranch to Sacramento. At 17 he graduated from Christian Brothers College in Sacramento, then studied law reading in the office of the distinguished Jurist Amos Catlin. Illness forced him to quit law during his twenties, but in his thirties, he was the private secretary to Governor James Budd, Secretary of the State Agricultural Society, and a law partner of Hiram W. Johnson who was later elected a governor and a United States senator.

In 1900, at 38, he was elected to the Superior Court in Sacramento. During his years on the bench, he took his mother's passion and philosophy for agriculture and became deeply embedded in the California Agricultural Law, policies and culture.

Of all his accomplishments, he was most proud of being known as the father of UC Davis, which he helped found in 1906. UC Davis has grown into a major university and hospital. The main UC Davis library and street still bear his name, and on campus there is an oak grove planted in his honor him. After his death, the Shields White Flower Garden was established when his wife of 60 years, Carolee died.

Shields helped push through the California State Legislature a bill establishing the UC Davis Agricultural College, fought for the funds and even helped select the site. A Peter J. Shields Scholarship fund of $7500 was established in 1939. He raised a prize-winning herd of Jersey Cattle and won so many prizes at the California State Fair, he finally withdrew to give others a chance to win.

During his career, many friends and peers urged him to run for Congress or a higher court, or even another higher political office, but Judge Shields refused, saying his "life and service belonged to the people of Sacramento". In keeping with this pledge, he wrote an annual birth message in the Sacramento Bee imparting his generous and intelligent philosophy and personal wisdom, applied to the problems of the time and looking into the future. He was active in promoting and establishing the Boy Scout movement in these region, and was an early president of the Golden Empire Council. Other accomplishments include being instrumental in the founding of the McGeorge School of Law in Sacramento.

When he was 95 years old, there was an article in the Bee citing a huge ovation of over 1000 students at UC Davis in Davis, Yolo County, and the college he established just west of Sacramento. In his annual birthday article, he called "The advanced years time to perfect life's work." He died at age 100, and left his entire estate to his widow.

Politics

A dedicated Jeffersonian Democrat and strong supporter of Congressman John Moss and Governor Edmund Brown of California, Shields served in honorary capacities in the campaigns of the later both for attorney general and for governor. He was known to be a confidant of presidents, senators, governors and educators.

References

1862 births
1962 deaths
American centenarians
Men centenarians
People from Rancho Cordova, California
University of California, Davis administrators
Superior court judges in the United States